A wedding song is a song sung as wedding music
 Wedding music in general
 A musical epithalamium
(The) Wedding Song  may refer to:

Books
 Wedding Song (novel), a novel by Naguib Mahfouz
Wedding Song, a 1994 romance novel by Vicki Lewis Thompson

Film
 The Wedding Song (1917 film), Hungarian film
 The Wedding Song (1925 film), American film
 The Wedding Song (2008 film), Franco-Tunisian film

Music

Classical
 The Bridal Chorus, from Richard Wagner's opera Lohengrin, used as wedding processional music
 The "Wedding March", from Felix Mendelssohn's incidental works (Op. 61), used as wedding recessional music
 Wedding Song, orchestral work by Elisabetta Brusa
 Hochzeits-Lied (Wedding Song), by Kurt Weil from The Threepenny Opera

Songs
 "Wedding Song (There Is Love)", a song by Paul Stookey
 "Wedding" (song), a 1966 single by Hep Stars
The Wedding (song) or "The Wedding Song", a song by Julie Rogers
 "Wedding Song", a song by  The Psychedelic Furs from The Psychedelic Furs
 "Wedding Song", a song by Bob Dylan from the album Planet Waves
 "The Wedding Song", a 1974 song by Ral Donner
 "The Wedding Song", a song by David Bowie from Black Tie White Noise
"Because We Are In Love (The Wedding Song)", by The Carpenters